Super Nancy is the second children's album by Lebanese recording artist Nancy Ajram. It was released on September 13, 2012 by In2Musica and Arabica Music. Following the critical success of her debut album Shakhbat Shakhabit, which was also exclusively oriented toward kids, Ajram decided to dedicate another record to them to show appreciation for their loyalty to her. The singer worked with several past collaborators she worked with in the previous kids album, while enlisting new ones. Super Nancy was well received by music critics. Three singles, which featured in the music video, were released in September 2012 from the album: "Ya Banat", "Stoohi", and "Baousi". "Ya Banat" received more than 300 million views on YouTube so far, making it one of the most-listened Arab songs of all time.

Development and release

During the preparations for her seventh studio album Nancy 7 (2010), Egyptian composer, Walid Saad, offered "Ya Banat"  to Ajram, and here she began considering a new album for kids. In early 2011, Ajram announced that she began preparing for the album. On June 6, 2012, Ajram tweeted that the album will be titled Super Nancy, and was initially scheduled for release at the end of month. On August 16, 2012, Ajram gave the first preview of the album during "Ana Wel Assal" TV show, when she sang parts of the lead song, "Ya Banat". A few days later, billboards featuring the album cover filled the streets in Lebanon, and it was then scheduled for release after Eid al-Fitr in late August, but due to delays in filming the music video, a later release date was set. "Ya Banat", the album's lead single, was sent to radios to premiere on September 10. The album was officially released worldwide on September 13.

The music video for Super Nancy, which features a medley of 3 songs from the album, was directed by renowned Lebanese director Leila Kanaan with a budget exceeding $350,000. filming took place between south of Lebanon and a studio in Beirut for four days. Ajram's daughters Mila and Ella were featured in the video. The video premiered on TV six days after the album release, on September 19, 2012.

Critical reception

Super Nancy has been lauded by contemporary music critics, many of whom have praised the song productions and the outstanding vocal performance by Nancy. Lebanon Files gave the album a positive review by adding "... With the end of the year and the beginning of a new year, and in a comprehensive look at what made by Nancy Ajram, we realize that it really deserves the title of 'Super Nancy.' In order to avoid any 'explosion,' has fed the blasts, we will leave this title for her own children and call Nancy Ajram, because her meeting Superstar Ragheb Alama in "Arab Idol" will generate an explosion (as expected).

Commercial performance

Super Nancy debuted at number one on the Best-Selling Albums Chart of HitMarker and stayed atop for continuous weeks. The album topped Virgin Megastores sales in the Arab world, then remained among the Top 10 highest-selling albums for non-continuous weeks. Super Nancy was voted "Video of The Year 2012" and "Album of The Year 2012" on Music Nation website.

Track listing

Standard edition

Credits

Tracks 1,2,5,8 - Lyrics: Nabil Khalaf, Music: Walid Saad, Production: Tooma

Tracks 4,6 - Lyrics: Nabil Khalaf, Music: Walid Saad, Production: Osama El Hendy

Tracks 3,7 - Lyrics: Adel Rafoul, Music and Production: Wassim Bustani

Personnel

Adapted from the album liner notes.

 Maurice Tawile – vocal recording (tracks 1,2,4,5,6,8)
 Dr. Amira El Nasser – children's choral conducting (tracks 1,2,4,5,6,8)
 Hisham El Gharb – studio choir (tracks 1,2,4,5,6,8)
 Ahmed Ayadi – studio choir (tracks 1,2,4,5,6,8)
 Farouk Mohammed Hasan – studio choir (tracks 1,2,4,5,6,8)
 Mostafa Aslan – studio choir (tracks 1,2,4,5,6,8)
 Mahmoud Souror – studio choir (tracks 1,2,4,5,6,8)
 Tamer El Zoaiby – mixing (tracks 1,2,5,8)
 Osama El Hendy – producer; mixing (tracks 4,6)
 Tony Haddad – mastering
 David Abdallah – photography
 Joe Saliba – photography
 Karine Wehbe – graphic design

Release history

References

Nancy Ajram albums
2012 albums
Children's music albums by Lebanese artists